Oncideres chagasi is a species of beetle in the family Cerambycidae. It was described by Martins in 1981. It is known from Brazil.

References

chagasi
Beetles described in 1981